Wilhelm ("Willy") Kohlmey (July 17, 1881 – September 9, 1953) was a German athlete.  He competed at the 1908 Summer Olympics in London. In the 100 metres, Kohlmey took third place in his first round heat with a time of 12.0 seconds.  He did not advance to the semifinals.

References

Sources
 
 
 

1881 births
1953 deaths
German male sprinters
Olympic athletes of Germany
Athletes (track and field) at the 1908 Summer Olympics